The MTV Movie Awards Mexico 2005 was hosted by Ilana Sod.

Winners and nominees

Favorite Movie
Matando Cabos
Puños Rosas
Temporada de patos

Favorite Actor
Adal Ramones as Alvaro - Puños Rosas
Diego Cataño as Moko - Temporada de patos
Jaime Camil as Eufemio - Zapata: El sueño de un héroe
Tony Dalton as Jaque - Matando Cabos

Favorite Actress
Cecilia Suárez as Alicia - Puños Rosas
Danny Perea as Rita - Temporada de patos
Elizabeth Valdéz as Diana - Las Lloronas
Francesca Guillén as Matilda - Santos Peregrinos

Best Song from a Movie
"El Pato" — Natalia y la Forquetina (Temporada de patos)
"Más Caliente Que El Sol" — Fobia (Matando Cabos)
"Nalguita" — Plastilina Mosh (Puños Rosas)
"Un Héroe Real" — Aleks Syntek (Robots)

Favorite Voice from an Animated Movie
Aleks Syntek as Rodney - Robots
Ely Guerra as Grace - Home on the Range
Eugenio Derbez as Donkey - Shrek 2
Víctor Trujillo as Bob - The Incredibles

Most Bizariest Sex
Jacqueline Voltaire and Silverio Palacios - Matando Cabos
Carmen Salinas and Javier de Rivera - Santos Peregrinos
Lucero and Alejandro Fernández - Zapata: El sueño de un héroe

Best Trio for a Movie
Anahí, Dulce María and Jolette - Rebeldía Académica
Lorena Herrera, Ninel Conde and Sergio Mayer - Sólo para Adultos
Libertad, Sabrina and Luis Felipe Tovar - Un Mundo Raro

Legend Award
Xavier López

MTV Movie & TV Awards